Lamproxyna is a genus of tephritid  or fruit flies in the family Tephritidae.

Species
Lamproxyna nitidula Hendel, 1914
Lamproxyna titschacki Hering, 1941

References

Tephritinae
Tephritidae genera
Diptera of South America